Three-time defending champion Esther Vergeer and her partner Korie Homan defeated Agnieszka Bartczak and Katharina Krüger in the final, 6–1, 6–0 to win the women's doubles wheelchair tennis title at the 2009 Australian Open. It was their first step towards an eventual Grand Slam.

Jiske Griffioen and Vergeer were the three-time defending champions, but did not compete together. Griffioen partnered Florence Gravellier, but was defeated in the semifinals by Bartczak and Krüger.

Seeds

  Korie Homan /  Esther Vergeer (champion)
 Florence Gravellier /  Jiske Griffioen (semifinals)

Draw

Finals

Wheelchair Women's Doubles
2009 Women's Doubles